Cheremshanka, may refer to:

Cheremshanka, Altai Republic, a settlement in Mayminsky District, Altai Republic, Russia
Cheremshanka, Altai Krai, a selo in Yeltsovsky District of the Altai Krai, Russia